Marriage Is a Crazy Thing is a 2002 South Korean erotic film, and the second film directed by South Korean poet-turned-director Yoo Ha.

Story 
Joon-young (Kam Woo-sung) is a Korean professor of English literature and a perpetual bachelor. But when he meets Yeon-hee (Uhm Jung-hwa) on a blind date, his days of bachelorhood seem numbered. But because of the views both of them have on marriage, she marries someone else and the professor becomes her kept man, living with her only on weekends. But even this limited relationship brings up the conflicts that result in fights and jealousy.

Cast
Kam Woo-sung - Joon-young
Uhm Jung-hwa - Yeon-hee
Park Won-sang - Kyu-jin
Kang So-jung - Se-eun
Yoon Ye-ri - Yoo-ri
Kim Ki-cheon - uncle
Lee Ju-sil - mother
Ryu Hyun-kyung - female student part-time worker

Awards
2002 Korean Film Awards
 Best New Actor - Kam Woo-sung

2003 Baeksang Arts Awards
 Best Actress - Uhm Jung-hwa

References

External links 
 
 

2002 films
2000s romance films
Films directed by Yoo Ha
2000s Korean-language films
South Korean erotic romance films
2000s South Korean films